The Coupe de France's results of the 1962–63 season. AS Monaco won the final played on May 12 and May 23, 1963, beating Olympique Lyonnais.

Round of 16

Quarter-finals

Semi-finals

Final

References

French federation

1962–63 domestic association football cups
1962–63 in French football
1962-63